Asolene is a genus of freshwater snails with an operculum, aquatic gastropod mollusks in the family Ampullariidae, the apple snails.

The distribution of the genus Asolene includes South America.

Species
There were recognized seven species within the genus Asolene as of 2011, when Asolene included subgenus Pomella Gray, 1847.

There are recognized 7 species within the genus Asolene:

 Asolene crassa (Swainson, 1823)
 Asolene granulosa (G. B. Sowerby III, 1894)
 Asolene meta (Ihering, 1915)
 Asolene petiti (Crosse, 1891)
 Asolene platae (Maton, 1809) - type species
 Asolene pulchella (Anton, 1839)
 Asolene spixii (d'Orbigny, 1837)

synonyms:
 Asolene americana (v. Ihering, 1919) is a synonym of ...
 Asolene fairchildi (Clench, 1933) is a synonym of Pomacea sinamarina (Bruguière, 1792)
 Asolene megastoma (G. B. Sowerby I, 1825) is a synonym of Pomacea megastoma (G. B. Sowerby I, 1825)

References

External links 

Ampullariidae